Kalinin is the name of several inhabited localities in Russia:

Rural localities
Kalinin, Republic of Adygea, a khutor in Maykopsky District of the Republic of Adygea
Kalinin, Kursk Oblast, a khutor in Kursky District of Kursk Oblast
Kalinin, Ryazan Oblast, a settlement in Ukholovsky District of Ryazan Oblast
Kalinin, name of several other rural localities

Historical names
Kalinin, name of the city of Tver between 1931 and 1990